William L. Thornton (November 28, 1844 – December 29, 1915) was an American lawyer and politician from New York.

Life
He was born on November 28, 1844, in Brooklyn. The family removed to Monticello, Sullivan County, New York when William was still a child. He attended Monticello Academy. Then he studied law with Archibald C. Niven, was admitted to the bar in 1865, and practiced law in Monticello.
 
In November 1878, he was elected on the Greenback ticket as Judge of Sullivan County, telling the voters that he would accept only $1,200 as annual salary, the salary for the county judge at that time being fixed at $2,500. He remained in office in 1879 and 1880 but was removed from office on January 5, 1881, by a decision of the New York Supreme Court. His defeated Democratic opponent Timothy Bush claimed that the offer to serve for a reduced salary was a bribe to the people, and Thornton should thus be declared ineligible under the anti-bribery law. This view was accepted by Supreme Court Justice Osborne, who declared the office vacant. Alpheus Potts was appointed to the office, to fill the vacancy. In November 1881, Thornton was re-elected as County Judge and served two terms until the end of 1893.

Thornton was a member of the New York State Senate (26th D.) from 1899 to 1902, sitting in the 122nd, 123rd, 124th and 125th New York State Legislatures.

Thornton was again County Judge from 1911 until the end of 1914, when he reached the constitutional age limit.

He died on December 29, 1915, in front of his home in Monticello, New York, from "heart disease" or "apoplexy"; and was buried at the Rock Ridge Cemetery there.

Sources

External links
 

1844 births
1915 deaths
Republican Party New York (state) state senators
People from Monticello, New York
New York (state) state court judges
People from Brooklyn
New York (state) Greenbacks
19th-century American judges